The War Logs may refer to:
 Iraq War documents leak
 Afghan War documents leak